Glenn Leonhard (born November 7, 1954 in Winnipeg, Manitoba) is a former professional Canadian football offensive lineman who played ten seasons in the Canadian Football League for the BC Lions. He was a part of the Lions' Grey Cup victory in 1985.

References 

1954 births
Living people
Players of Canadian football from Manitoba
Canadian football offensive linemen
BC Lions players
Manitoba Bisons football players
Canadian football people from Winnipeg